The Gatún Formation (Tg) is a geologic formation in the Colón and Panamá Provinces of central Panama. The formation crops out in and around the Panama Canal Zone. The coastal to marginally marine sandstone, siltstone, claystone, tuff and conglomerate formation dates to the latest Serravallian to Tortonian (Clarendonian to Hemphillian in the NALMA classification), from 12 to 8.5 Ma. It preserves many fossils, among others, megalodon teeth have been found in the formation.

Description 
The Gatún Formation was first defined and named as such by Howe in 1907. The formation was known before and when William Phipps Blake traveled across Panama in 1853 on his way to California to join one of the transcontinental railroad surveying parties, he collected a few Gatún Formation fossils. In the Canal Zone the contact between the formation with the underlying Caimito Formation is covered by the waters of Lake Gatún and even before the flooding of the lake perhaps all of the contact was concealed by swamps.

Massive medium- to very fine-grained sandstones and siltstones are the chief constituents of the Gatún Formation. They are somewhat calcareous, or marly, somewhat tuffaceous, and have a clay-like matrix. The sandstone contains numerous grains of black and greenish volcanic rocks and is practically a subgraywacke. Conglomerates and hard brittle very fine-grained tuff make up a small part of the formation. Basalt intrudes older formations in the Lake Gatún area, but is not known to penetrate the Gatún Formation.

Fossil content 

 Agatrix agathe
 Aphera aphrodite
 Axelella cativa
 Bivetiella dilatata
 Cancellaria harzhauseri, C. mixta
 Carcharocles megalodon
 Carinodrillia zooki
 Chilomycterus exspectatus, C. tyleri
 Conasprella burckhardti, C. imitator
 Conus (Stephanoconus) woodringi
 Cryoturris habra
 Cynoscion latiostialis, C. scitulus
 Diaphus apalus, D. gatunensis
 Euclia alacertata
 Hindsiclava consors
 Lepophidium gentilis
 Leucosyrinx xenica
 Massyla toulai
 Pyruclia tweedledee, P. tweedledum
 Umbrina opima
 Ventrilia coatesi

See also 
 List of fossiliferous stratigraphic units in Panama

References

Bibliography

Further reading 
 C. Pimiento, G. González-Barba, D. J. Ehret, B. J. MacFadden, A. J. W. Hendy and C. Jaramillo. 2013. Sharks and Rays (Chondrichthyes, Elasmobranchii) from the late Miocene Gatún Formation of Panama. Journal of Paleontology 87(5):755-774

Geologic formations of Panama
Neogene Panama
Tortonian
Clarendonian
Hemphillian
Sandstone formations
Siltstone formations
Conglomerate formations
Tuff formations
Shallow marine deposits
Paleontology in Panama
Formations
Formations
Formations